"All My Love" is a 2013 song by Richard Beynon and Zen Freeman featuring singer CeCe Peniston, released as a digital single in Europe through Magik Muzik on March 11, 2013.

Credits and personnel
 Cecilia Peniston - lead vocals
 Le Duc  - producer, remix
 Shakeh  - producer, remix
 Mark Schneider  - producer, remix
 Roland Faber  - producer, remix

Track listing and format
 MD, EU, #MM 1029-0
 "All My Love"  -  4:47
 "All My Love (Traydkraft Remix)" - 4:19
 "All My Love (Loverush UK Remix)" - 6:04
 "All My Love (Loverush UK Instrumental Mix)" - 6:05
 "All My Love (Radio Edit)" - 3:23
 "All My Love (Loverush UK Radio Edit)" - 3:31

References

General

 Specific

External links 
 

2013 singles
CeCe Peniston songs
2013 songs